Harry German (1 November 1865 – 14 June 1945) was an English cricketer.  German was a right-handed batsman who occasionally fielded as a wicket-keeper.  He was born at Measham, Leicestershire.

German made his first-class debut for Leicestershire against Essex in the 1896 County Championship.  He made four further first-class appearances for Leicestershire, the last of which came against Middlesex in the 1898 County Championship.  In his five first-class matches, he scored a total of 69 runs at an average of 7.66, with a high score of 13.

He died at Charing Cross, London on 14 June 1945.  His nephew, Arthur German, also played first-class cricket for Leicestershire.

References

External links
Harry German at ESPNcricinfo
Harry German at CricketArchive

1865 births
1945 deaths
People from Measham
Cricketers from Leicestershire
English cricketers
Leicestershire cricketers